Goierria-Ziortza is a Spanish town within the municipality of Markina-Xemein, in the province of Biscay, in the autonomous community of Basque Country.

References

External links
Map 

Populated places in Biscay